General elections were held in Saint Vincent and the Grenadines on 20 April 1961. The result was a victory for the People's Political Party, which won six of the nine seats. Voter turnout was 77.1%.

Results

References

Saint Vincent
Elections in Saint Vincent and the Grenadines
1961 in Saint Vincent and the Grenadines
West Indies Federation